Basketball at the 2018 Commonwealth Games was held on the Gold Coast, Australia from April 5 to 15. The basketball competition was held at three venues: Cairns Convention Centre in Cairns, Townsville Entertainment and Convention Centre in Townsville for the preliminaries and the Gold Coast Convention and Exhibition Centre on the Gold Coast for the finals. This was the second time that the basketball competition was held at the Commonwealth Games. A total of eight men's and eight women's teams from a total of eleven nations competed (192 athletes, at 12 per team) in each respective tournament.

Competition schedule 
The following is the competition schedule for the basketball competitions: The final schedule was released on August 29, 2017.

Venues 
Three venues in Queensland were used. All seat 5,000 for the basketball competitions.

Qualification
A total of eight men's teams and eight women's teams qualified to compete at the games. Each nation may enter one team in each tournament (12 athletes per team) for a maximum total of 24 athletes. At least four out of the six Commonwealth regions were considered to be represented in each tournament, if possible. For the home nations, each country may compete, however the ranking of Great Britain was given to the home nation with the most players on the team. In this instance its unknown which team was used to determine that. For the purpose below England is attributed the rankings spot and Scotland is noted as being invited

The teams were officially confirmed on July 28, 2017.

Men's competition

Qualified teams

Women’s competition

Qualified teams

Participating nations
There are 11 participating nations at the basketball competitions with a total of 192 athletes. The number of athletes a nation entered is in parentheses beside the name of the country.

Medal summary

Medal table

Medalists

References

External links
 Results Book – Basketball

 
2018 Commonwealth Games events
2018
Commonwealth Games
Commonwealth Games